The Mexican is a 1955 Soviet drama film directed by Vladimir Kaplunovsky based on a short story by Jack London.

Plot
During the early years of the Mexican Revolution, a group of Mexicans rebels living in Los Angeles begin collecting money to fund the Revolutionary Army who is fighting to overthrow the Porfirio Díaz's regime. Felipe Rivera, a young man who just crossed the Mexico–United States border wants to join the rebels. He is accepted in the group only under the condition that he proves his loyalty to the revolutionary cause.

Knowing that the rebels lack enough money to buy weapons to arm the revolutionaries, Rivera decides to fight against well-know boxer Danny Ward in order to secure some funds for the Revolutionary Army.

Cast
Oleg Strizhenov as Fernández / Felipe Rivera
Boris Andreyev as Felipe Vera
Daniil Sagal as Arellano
Mark Petrovsky as Ramos
Nadezhda Rumyantseva as May
Vladimir Dorofeyev as Diego
Tatiana Samoilova as María
Lev Durasov as Unit Commander
Mikhail Astangov as Kelly
Georgi Slabinyak as Roberts
Gennady Stepanov as Danny Ward

See also
The Fighter (1952 film)

References

External links

1955 films
1955 drama films
1950s historical films
Films based on works by Jack London
Films set in Mexico
Mexican Revolution films
Mosfilm films
Films set in Los Angeles
1950s Russian-language films
Soviet drama films